The Valday class of freight ships carry dry cargo, containers and timber up and down the rivers of Northern Russia. The class is named after Valday, a town midway between Moscow and St. Petersburg on the shores of Valdai Lake in the Valdai Hills.

Description
The Valdays have three covered holds, with engineering spaces and superstructure in the stern.

Ships
Svyatoy Apostol Andrey
Svyatoy Knyaz Vladimir
Svyatitel Aleksiy

External links
Motor ship "ST. APOSTLE ANDREY" project 01010 ("Valday")

Ships of Russia